Rome Elks Lodge No. 96, also known as the Benjamin Leonard House, is a historic Elk's lodge located at Rome in Oneida County, New York.  It consists of an asymmetrical, early Italianate style brick main section (c. 1848), with a large rectangular rear addition (1932), and a sun porch and projecting Classical Revival style portico (1926).  The portico features two Doric order fluted columns.  It was originally built as a dwelling, but rehabilitated in 1926 for use as an Elk's Lodge.

It was listed on the National Register of Historic Places in 2013.

References

Rome, New York
Clubhouses on the National Register of Historic Places in New York (state)
Italianate architecture in New York (state)
Neoclassical architecture in New York (state)
Houses completed in 1848
Buildings and structures in Oneida County, New York
National Register of Historic Places in Oneida County, New York